Cloud City Ice Cream is an ice cream parlor in Portland, Oregon.

Description 
Cloud City Ice Cream is an ice cream parlor in southeast Portland's Woodstock neighborhood. The menu includes ice cream cake, ice cream sandwiches ("Pie Creams"), and the Unicone (a sugar cone dipped in white chocolate, with ice cream and sprinkles). The Cherry Bomb has tart cherry ice cream and a vanilla pie crust. The Malted French Silk has malted chocolate ice cream and a dark chocolate pie crust. The Snappy Goat ice cream sandwich has lemon goat cheese ice cream with a ginger snap pie crust.

Ice cream cakes have included the Ginger Pumpkin Chai, the Malted Chocolate Cherry Bomb, and the Mexican Coca-Cola Cake, which has dark chocolate butter cake, vanilla chiffon cake, caramel ice cream, cinnamon buttercream, and a dark chocolate glaze. Drink options include coffee (Stumptown Coffee Roasters), hot chocolate, ice cream floats, and milkshakes. Waffle cones are made on site.

The Stumptown (coffee) ice cream flavor was the most popular, as of 2012. Other ice cream flavors have included butter pecan, cookies and cream, honey lavender, pistachio, sea salt cookie dough, Grilled Peach Sweet Tea, and Sasquatch Tracks. Circus Friends has Mother's Circus Animal Cookies and sweet cream, and Totes Ma'Goats has goat cheese ice cream with lemon curd. The Sunshine is a vegan option and has cardamom, cinnamon, turmeric, and Thai coconut milk. The Bourbon Vanilla uses Burnside Bourbon and the Chocolate Stout flavor uses Hopworks Urban Brewery's Survival Stout beer.

History 
Spouses Bryan and Sarah Gilbert opened Cloud City Ice Cream in 2011. The business replaced Chill Ice Cream, which was sold following the deaths of the owners earlier in the year. The ice cream parlor Surf Shack operated in the same space prior to Chill Ice Cream. Andrea Bowers was Cloud City's initial pastry chef. The company's logo and business cards were designed by local artist Guita Anderson.

Reception 

In 2012, Nora Eileen Jones of Willamette Week said of the chocolate stout ice cream with Hopworks, "It was insanely good and surprisingly refreshing for a chocolate ice cream—the stout in the mixture added some tiny yet welcome ice crystals to the thick confection. It's a very mature flavor, with more rich darkness to it than your average chocolate ice cream." Lizzy Acker recommended the Totes Ma'Goats and Sunshine flavors in The Oregonian's 2018 list of "23 of the best frozen treats from around Portland you need to try this summer".

Darcy Schild selected Cloud City for Oregon in Business Insider 2019 list of the best ice cream shops in each U.S. state. Pete Cottell included Cloud City in Thrillist's 2019 list of Portland's "most essential spots" for ice cream. He said the business was "perhaps the newest superstar in the Portland ice cream scene" and wrote, "It's rare that a nouveau riche ice cream boutique manages to impress both adults and children in equal measure, but Cloud City continually knocks it out of the park for tastes that are at once juvenile, sophisticated, and that weird grey area in between." Michelle Lopez and Brooke Jackson-Glidden included Cloud City in Eater Portland 2021 list of "Where to Find Supremely Tasty Ice Cream in Portland", writing:  The website's Nathan Williams recommended Cloud City in a 2022 overview of eateries in the Woodstock neighborhood.

References

External links 

 
 
 Cloud City Ice Cream at Zomato

2011 establishments in Oregon
Ice cream parlors in the United States
Restaurants established in 2011
Restaurants in Portland, Oregon
Woodstock, Portland, Oregon